Serge Branco (born 11 October 1980) is a Cameroonian former professional footballer who played as a defender and as a midfielder.

Club career
Branco was born in Douala. In 1998, he left Cameroon to spend the initial years of his career in Germany. He started out at Regionalliga Nord side Eintracht Braunschweig, where he spent two seasons. After returning from the 2000 Summer Olympics in Sydney, Branco transferred to Bundesliga side Eintracht Frankfurt in October 2000. Frankfurt were relegated to the 2. Bundesliga in 2001, but Branco stayed on for two more seasons at the club before returning to the Bundesliga by signing with VfB Stuttgart in 2003. However, he did not become a regular in Stuttgart, making only three league appearances in 2003–04.

He signed for Leeds United in August 2004, but was released on 13 September for fitness reasons. From 2005 to 2007 he played in the Russian league, before returning to Germany for a stint with MSV Duisburg.

International career
Branco represented the victorious Cameroonian national team at the 2000 Summer Olympics. He was capped once for the Cameroonian senior national team, in a World Cup qualification match against Zambia in 2001.

Honours
Wisła Kraków
 Ekstraklasa: 2010–11

Cameroon
 2000 Olympic Games

References

External links
 
 

Living people
1980 births
Footballers from Douala
Association football defenders
Association football midfielders
Cameroonian footballers
Cameroonian expatriate footballers
Cameroon international footballers
Bundesliga players
2. Bundesliga players
English Football League players
Russian Premier League players
Ekstraklasa players
Super League Greece players
Eintracht Braunschweig players
Eintracht Frankfurt players
VfB Stuttgart players
MSV Duisburg players
Wisła Kraków players
Leeds United F.C. players
Queens Park Rangers F.C. players
Unisport Bafang players
FC Shinnik Yaroslavl players
PFC Krylia Sovetov Samara players
Levadiakos F.C. players
Olympic footballers of Cameroon
Olympic gold medalists for Cameroon
Olympic medalists in football
Footballers at the 2000 Summer Olympics
Medalists at the 2000 Summer Olympics
Cameroonian expatriate sportspeople in Germany
Expatriate footballers in Germany
Expatriate footballers in Russia
Expatriate footballers in England
Cameroonian expatriate sportspeople in Poland
Expatriate footballers in Poland
Expatriate footballers in Greece
Cameroonian expatriate sportspeople in Russia
Cameroonian expatriate sportspeople in England
Cameroonian expatriate sportspeople in Greece
Cameroonian expatriate sportspeople in Bahrain
Cameroonian expatriate sportspeople in Kuwait
Expatriate footballers in Bahrain
Expatriate footballers in Kuwait
Kuwait Premier League players
Al-Yarmouk SC (Kuwait) players